First Wave is a Canadian science fiction drama television series created by Chris Brancato, with Francis Ford Coppola as the show's executive producer. It originally aired on the Space Channel. Filmed in Vancouver, British Columbia, Canada, the series focuses on the struggles of Cade Foster (Sebastian Spence) who almost single-handedly attempts to resist a secret alien invasion. The show was subsequently picked up by the Sci-Fi Channel in the United States which then, in an unusual move, expanded their pickup of the series to a 66-episode order. It premiered on September 9, 1998, and ended on February 7, 2001, with a total of 66 episodes over the course of 3 seasons.

Series overview

Episodes

Season 1 (1998–1999)

Season 2 (1999–2000)

Season 3 (2000–2001)

References

External links 
 
 

Lists of Canadian drama television series episodes